During World War II, Czechoslovakia was divided into four different regions, each administered by a different authority: Sudetenland (Germany), Protectorate of Bohemia and Moravia, the Slovak State, and Carpathian Ruthenia and southern Slovakia (Hungary). 

As a result, the Holocaust unfolded differently in each of these areas:
The Holocaust in the Sudetenland
The Holocaust in Bohemia and Moravia
The Holocaust in Slovakia
The Holocaust in Hungary